Gillian K. Ferguson (born 1965) is a Scottish poet and journalist, born and living in Edinburgh, Scotland. She is the creator of Air for Sleeping Fish (Bloodaxe) and the best-seller, Baby: Poems on Pregnancy, Birth and Babies (Canongate, 2001). She won a £25,000 Creative Scotland Award and created a major poetry project exploring the human genome called The Human Genome: Poems on the Book of Life, About her project, she said, "the Genome has remained fascinating throughout; a fantastic, beautiful poem - a magnificent work of Chemistry spanning four billion years of the art of Evolution." The project was praised, including by broadcaster, Andrew Marr of the BBC, Francis Collins, Head of the US Human Genome Project and by philosopher Mary Midgley author of Science and Poetry (Routledge).

She has won three writer's bursaries from the Scottish Arts Council (now Creative Scotland). Her most recent work is Flora: The Evolution of Eden about man's genetic connection and common ancestor with plants and flowers. In 2015, she suffered a severe stroke and writes while still in recovery.

Education 
She holds an honours degree from the University of Edinburgh in Philosophy, specializing in Aesthetics and Metaphysics.

Work history 
After graduation, she worked as a tutor for Open University, an illustrator, and a jewelry-maker.  As a journalist, she was a columnist and features writer at national papers in Scotland; mainly The Scotsman, where she was also a book and television reviewer, and Scotland on Sunday, where she was the television critic and had a celebrity interview column. She also wrote a short humorous column, '‘This Week’' for the Financial Times weekend magazine, and reviewed events in Scotland for BBC Radio 2 arts programme. She regularly contributed columns to John Peel's BBC Radio 4's Home Truths.

She was a media consultant for nearly ten years at Save the Children Scotland. She was co-director of a small media company specialising in charities and not-for-profits, with clients including the Disasters Emergency Committee (DEC) and Make Poverty History.

She co-founded Poetryzoo.com, a global digital platform for the creation and showcasing of poetry at all levels.

She served as a judge in the Edwin Morgan International Poetry Competition. She also judged for the National Poetry Day Poems for Postcards Competition, in the Faber/Ottakars Poetry Competition, and the Creative Scotland Awards.

Publications and digital projects 
 Air for Sleeping Fish (Bloodaxe, 1997), shortlisted for the Scottish First Book of the Year award 
 Baby: Poems on Pregnancy, Birth and Babies (Canongate, UK; Grove Atlantic, US, 2001).  She did a promotional edition with BabyGAP. 
 The Human Genome: Poems on the Book of Life (B&T 2008)

 Anthology contributions 
 New Blood (Bloodaxe)
 Faber Book of 20th Century Scottish Poems (Faber)
 Dream States (Faber)
 Making for Planet Alice (Bloodaxe)
 New Scottish Poets (Polygon)
 Modern Scottish Women Poets (Canongate)
 Edinburgh Book of 20th Century Scottish Poetry (Edinburgh University Press)
 Handsel (Scottish Poetry Library/Polygon)
 100 Favourite Scottish Poems (Luath/Scottish Poetry Library)

 Awards 
Prizewinner, Daily Telegraph Arvon International Poetry Competition
The £25,000 Creative Scotland Award for Literature (Scottish Arts Council  (2002)
Shortlisted, the Scottish First Book of the Year
The Scottish Arts Council (now Creative Scotland) - three Writer’s Bursaries

 References 

 External links 
 Gillian's poetry at PoetryZoo.comThe Human Genome: Poems on the Book of Life''

Scottish women poets
1965 births
20th-century Scottish poets
Alumni of the University of Edinburgh
21st-century Scottish poets
Living people
21st-century Scottish women writers
20th-century Scottish women writers